Achille D'Orsi (6 August 1845 – 8 February 1929) was an Italian sculptor from Naples. Like his Neapolitan contemporary, Vincenzo Gemito, he worked 
in the Verismo style of Realism.

References

19th-century Neapolitan people
19th-century Italian sculptors
Italian male sculptors
20th-century Italian sculptors
20th-century Italian male artists
1929 deaths
1845 births
19th-century Italian male artists